Monmouth School for Boys is a public school (independent boarding and day school) for boys in Monmouth, Wales. The school was founded in 1614 with a bequest from William Jones, a successful merchant and trader. The School is run as a trust, the William Jones's Schools Foundation, by the Worshipful Company of Haberdashers, one of the livery companies, and has close links to its sister school, Haberdashers' Monmouth School for Girls. In 2018, the Haberdashers renamed their group of schools in the town, the Monmouth Schools, and made corresponding changes to the names of the boys' and girls' schools.

The school is situated on the eastern edge of the border town of Monmouth, adjacent to the River Wye. Nothing of the original school buildings from the 17th century remains as the school was completely rebuilt in the mid to late 19th century. Later developments have included the Science Block (1981–1984) and the William Jones Building of the early 21st century (2014). In 2014, the quatercentenary of the school's foundation was celebrated with a service at St Paul's Cathedral.

Established originally as a grammar school, by the early 1870s Monmouth was a member of the recently formed Headmasters' Conference and had acquired the status of a public school.  Between 1946 and 1976 it was part of the direct grant scheme, returning to full independence in 1976. A member of the Headmasters' and Headmistresses' Conference, the school has a roll of approximately 650 pupils. The fees for 2019/2020 are £16,275 for day boys, and £30,852 for boarders. The William Jones's Schools Foundation, which funds the Monmouth Schools on behalf of the Haberdashers’ Company, recorded an income of £20.5M against an expenditure of £24.0M in its accounts for 2020. In June 2022, the Haberdashers initiated a consultation on merging the school with the girls school in the town to create a fully coeducational establishment by 2024.

History

Years of foundation: 1613–1616
In 1613, William Jones, a prominent merchant and haberdasher, gave the Haberdashers’ Company £6,000, followed by a further £3,000 bequeathed in his will on his death in 1615, to "ordaine a preacher, a Free-School and Almes-houses for twenty poor and old distressed people, as blind and lame, as it shall seem best to them, of the Towne of Monmouth, where it shall be bestowed". Jones was born at Newland, Gloucestershire and brought up in Monmouth, leaving to make a sizeable fortune as a London merchant engaged in the cloth trade with the continent. The motivations for his bequest appear partly philanthropic and partly evangelical; the county of Monmouthshire in the early 17th century had a significant Catholic presence and the local historian Keith Kissack noted, "the priority given to the preacher illustrates [Jones's] concern to convert an area in the Marches which was still, when the school opened in 1614, strongly recusant". The order for the establishment of the school was made, retrospectively by James I in 1616 and decreed "for ever in the town of Monmouth, one almshouse and one free grammar school".

The Haberdashers purchased four fields as the site for the school before Jones's death, paying the sum of £100. Royal permission for this charitable purchase was required under the Statute of Mortmain, which was granted in 1614. By Jones's death in Hamburg in 1615, the almshouses, and the schoolroom and headmaster's house had been completed, although nothing now remains of the original school buildings. The bulk of Jones's considerable bequest was used for the purchase of lands at New Cross, in South-East London, and the rent rolls from that estate provided the money for the salaries and running costs associated with the school, as well as the payment of pensions to the residents of the almshouses.

The first headmaster was John Owen, M.A. of Queens' College, Cambridge, appointed on a salary of £60 per annum. Neither Owen, nor many of his 17th and 18th century successors, lasted very long unlike the school day which ran from 7–11 a.m., followed by an afternoon session from 1.30 to 5.00 p.m.

Years of uncertainty: 1617–1799

The mid-twentieth-century historian of the school, H. A. Ward, described its early history as "the precarious years". Continuing religious controversy, coupled with the English Civil War, made the town of Monmouth a divided and uncertain setting for the school. Divisions between staff, and the financial instability, and remoteness, of the Haberdashers Company, which was compelled to make substantial loans to the Parliamentary government that went unpaid for decades, and was then required to finance the rebuilding of their livery hall which was destroyed during the Great Fire of London, contributed to internal weaknesses. These difficulties continued well into the 18th century, and at one point, during the headship of the "morose and tyrannical" John Crowe, who was removed from his post after becoming insane, the school roll fell to just three boys. A source for information regarding the school in the mid-17th century is the diary of the school's usher, More Pye. The diary, extracts from which were published in the Monmouthshire Beacon in 1859 but which is now lost, records Pye's experiences in great detail from the date of his appointment in 1646 until his resignation in 1652. An example is Pye's entry for February 18, 1647; "Pd (paid) 6d ffor (for) wormeseedes and triacle for ye boys". A less parochial entry for November 11, 1647, records Pye's monarchist sympathies, "Ye King's Magy (Majesty) made an escape from Hampton Court, out of ye Armye's power. Vivat, vivat in aeternum".

Years of controversy: 1800–1850
Ward described the early 19th century period of the school's history as years of "controversy". These focused mainly on three issues; relations between the school and the town, relations between the school, the town and the Haberdashers Company and the Court of Chancery, which together were responsible for the school's funding and oversight, and attempts to expand the school's curriculum beyond the traditional study of Latin and Greek. The first issue saw the school perceived as part of the faction of the Dukes of Beaufort, the premier landowners in the county, and directors of the town's politics from their regional base at Troy House. Early 19th century Monmouth had a strong Radical tradition led by burgesses such as Thomas Thackwell, and fuelled by the liberal positions of the local newspapers, the Monmouthshire Beacon and the Monmouthshire Merlin. The school's leadership was perceived in the town to be too close to the Beauforts, and Thackwell ran an almost fifty-year campaign against their attempts to defend the established order. The second controversy related to the governance of the school and another long campaign of attrition saw the school's Lecturer lose the responsibility for preparing an annual report on the school, this being transferred by the Court of Chancery to a Board of Visitors. The last area of conflict arose between the school's leadership, which wanted to maintain the tradition of a curriculum that involved the study solely of Latin and Greek, and the Court and the Haberdashers who wanted expansion to cover such areas as writing and arithmetic. In a damming report in 1827 they condemned "the present Masters, though so liberally paid, and having so little to do, consider themselves engaged only to teach Latin and Greek. A school teaching those branches of learning only will never be useful to a place of such confined population as Monmouth". Reforms introduced by John Oakley Hill in 1852, saw the establishment of Upper and Lower Schools, the former continuing to provide a classical education, while the latter had a curriculum focused on writing and arithmetic. William Coxe, who undertook extensive tours of Wales in the very late 18th and early 19th centuries in the company of his friend, Sir Richard Colt Hoare, recorded his impressions of the school in the second volume of his An Historical tour in Monmouthshire, published in 1801. Describing the school as enjoying "a high reputation under the care of (the headmaster) the Rev. John Powell", Coxe retells the mythical story of the school's establishment and records a "portrait of the founder, habited in the costume of the age of James the First, with an inscription 'Walter William Jones, haberdasher and merchant of London etc.' is preserved in the school room".

Years of expansion: 1851–1913
In the early 1850s the Court of Chancery insisted on the appointment of an external examiner. His report of 1852 was not encouraging; "many of the boys appear so ignorant as to be a disgrace to their parents, still more than to their teachers". If the academic outlook remained bleak, the financial position of the school was transformed in this period. The sale of part of the New Cross estate to railway developers, and the vastly increased rents accruing from the development and expansion of London saw the Haberdashers' fortunes dramatically increase. The availability of funds led to the complete rebuilding of the school on its original site between 1864, the school's 250th anniversary, and the end of the century. The school's expansion was undertaken during the long reign of the Rev. Charles Manley Roberts, headmaster for 32 years from 1859 to 1892. During Roberts's time Monmouth became an early member of the prestigious Headmaster's Conference (created by Edward Thring of Uppingham in 1869), a mark of its increasing reputation and status as a public school. The school's reputation for sporting prowess also rose, its rugby teams and rowers enjoying particular success. As a result of rising revenues from rents and investments, by the mid-19th century, Monmouth's endowment was one of largest of any school in England and Wales. To use the resulting surpluses, the original foundation was reorganised in 1891 to support a new girls’ school and an elementary school in the town, as well as a boys' grammar school West Monmouth School in Pontypool. As importantly for the school's development, the rule that limited applications to boys from Monmouthshire and the neighbouring counties was set aside, and applications were opened to the entirety of Wales and England.

Years of war: 1914–1945

Monmouth School's Combined Cadet Force was reportedly the last CCF in the country to change its uniforms to khaki from the traditional blue at the outbreak of war in August 1914. The conflict brought the award of the school's only Victoria Cross, awarded to Angus Buchanan in 1916 for conspicuous bravery in the Mesopotamian campaign. Blinded by a bullet to the head the following year, he returned to Monmouthshire and worked as a solicitor in Coleford, unveiling the school's war memorial in 1921. In total, seventy-six old boys from the school were killed in the war. The school's Bricknell Library, founded in 1921, commemorated one of them, Ernest Thomas Samuel Bricknell, who died in October 1916 from wounds received at the Battle of the Somme.

Further loss of life occurred in 1921, when the Head of School, G. H. Sutherland, drowned in the Wye during a rowing match between the school and Hereford Cathedral School. Sutherland is commemorated by the sundial in the school's cloister. The Second World War added the names of a further sixty-one Old Monmothians to the lists of the dead inscribed on the school's war memorial. During the war, the school hosted the entire school and staff from King Edward VI Five Ways School, Birmingham, who were evacuated due to German bombing of the Midlands.

Recent years: 1946–present
Internal conflict within the school's management continued in the mid-twentieth century, with the governors sacking two headmasters within three years. This led to the school's expulsion from the Headmasters Conference, and to that body's advising any of its members against applying for the vacant headship. The impasse was resolved in 1959, with the appointment of Robert Glover. Reorganisation of the Haberdashers' endowments also occurred at this time. The elementary school, founded with Haberdashers' funds in 1891, was transferred to County Council control in 1940 with West Monmouth School at Pontypool following in 1955. This left the William Jones's Schools Foundation responsible for Monmouth School and Haberdashers' Monmouth School for Girls – also known as HMSG – both of which joined the Direct Grant scheme in 1946.

Another significant development for the school's location was the building of the A40, which "severed (Monmouth) ruthlessly from the river on which in the past it had depended" and cut off the school from its historic frontage onto the River Wye. This led to the permanent closure of the school's ceremonial entrance, the Wye Bridge Gate, constructed by Henry Stock in the 1890s. The direct impact on the school was perhaps less significant, Ward had recorded an early comment on the entrance, "that ancient gate which never opened is but thrice a year on notable occasions, such as when the coal cart comes".

In 1976, with the ending of the Direct Grant system, the school returned to full independence. Having argued strongly against the ending of the grant system, the headmaster at the time, Robert Glover, gave a warning as to the likely consequences, "if direct grant goes, the school which has served the boys of Monmouth for four hundred years, will suddenly become for many families financially prohibitive". In response, a committee of the Old Monmothian Club, headed by Lord Brecon and Sir Derek Ezra undertook a campaign to raise funding for scholarships which accumulated £100,000 in ten weeks. During his tenure Glover also secured re-admittance to the Headmasters' Conference. To mark the school's four hundredth anniversary a service of thanksgiving was held at St. Paul's Cathedral, on 19 March 2014, attended by some 2,200 pupils and staff from the school and from Haberdashers' Monmouth School for Girls, as well as Haberdashers and friends of the Schools.

In 2018, the Haberdashers rebranded their group of schools in the town as Haberdashers Monmouth Schools and renamed the senior schools as Monmouth School for Boys and Monmouth School for Girls respectively. In its most recent accounts, published in 2020, the William Jones's Schools Foundation, which funds the Monmouth group of schools on behalf of the Haberdahers’ Company, recorded an expenditure of £24.0M against an income of £20.5M. In June 2022, the Haberdashers began a consultation on proposals to merge the Boys and Girls schools, making them fully coeducational by 2024.

Histories of the school

The Monmouthshire antiquarian Charles Heath described the traditional, and almost certainly inaccurate, story of the school's foundation in his Accounts of the Ancient and Present State of the Town of Monmouth, published in 1804. Heath records that William Jones, now established as a successful and wealthy merchant, returned to his home town of Newland disguised as a beggar. Receiving a hostile reception, he travelled to Monmouth, where he was more warmly received and where, as a consequence, he funded the construction of the school and associated almshouses. The story is taken from an earlier oral tradition, also recorded in Archdeacon Coxe's An Historical Tour in Monmouthshire, published three years before. In 1899, the Rev. W. M. Warlow published his History of the Charities of William Jones at Monmouth and Newland. His fellow cleric and master, the Rev. K. M. Pitt wrote a more focused account, Monmouth School in the 1860s. H. A. Ward published Monmouth School: 1614–1964: An Outline History to commemorate the school's 350th anniversary. In 1995, Keith Kissack published his history, Monmouth School and Monmouth: 1614–1995. In 2014, in celebration of the school's quatercentenary, two masters at the school, Stephen Edwards, who wrote the text, and Keith Moseley, who took the photographs, published a new history, Monmouth School: The First 400 Years.

Buildings

William Jones's original foundation provided for a schoolroom, on the site of the present chapel, houses for the Headmaster and Lecturer, and almshouses segregated by sex. A painting by J.A. Evans, of later date and purchased on behalf of the school by the then Headmaster Lionel James in 1921, shows the buildings and is titled The Old School Room. Built A.D. 1614. Pulled down to make room for the present school room, 1865. Nothing of these buildings remains. The local writer and artist Fred Hando records that the bell, which hung above the schoolroom, was cast at the Evan Evans foundry at Chepstow in 1716.

In 1864 the Haberdashers undertook a substantial rebuilding of the school. Funded by the rising fortunes of Jones's bequest on the back of the Victorian expansion of London, the work was mostly undertaken by William Snooke and Henry Stock, of the firm Snooke & Stock, surveyors to the Haberdashers' Company. Snooke built the chapel, two schoolrooms and a classroom in 1864–1865, followed in the 1870s by the library, Headmaster's House and the buildings which now form Monmouth House and Hereford House.  These buildings are all Grade II listed. The Monmouth Alms Houses, on Almshouse Street, were rebuilt by J. B. Bunning in 1842, and redeveloped by William Burn in 1895–1896. They now form part of the school and incorporate a large inscription panel describing the benefactions of the Jones Foundation. The almshouses are also Grade II listed. The chapel was further extended in 1875. Snooke's work was not universally praised; a report from the School's Commissioner commenting, "the architect has arranged the buildings in a most inconvenient manner, and the ventilation is deficient." School House, with its ceremonial arched entrance and coat of arms facing the Wye Bridge, and the adjacent technology block, were designed by Henry Stock in 1894–1895. They are Grade II listed buildings as of 8 October 2005. The style of the School House block mirrors that of the main block of Haberdashers' Monmouth School for Girls, which Stock designed at the same time. The war memorial was dedicated in 1921, Angus Buchanan (VC) attending the ceremony. The memorial is a Grade II listed structure. To the west of Stock's School House block, and set into the wall previously facing the Wye and now completely overshadowed by the A40 by-pass, is a pair of iron gates, of 18th century date and installed at the school in 1941. They come from the Haberdashers' Hall in London which was destroyed during the Blitz.

The school's building of greatest architectural merit is the Grade II* listed Chapel House. The architectural historian John Newman describes the 18th century building, situated on the Hereford Road away from the main school site, as "the best house in the entire street". More modern developments include the Hall of 1961, redeveloped in the early 21st century and now the Blake Theatre, the Red Lion Block of the same date and the Science Block of 1981–1984. In 1985–1986, two ceramic murals were designed for the chapel by the Polish religious artist Adam Kossowski, a friend and wartime colleague of the school's Head of Art from 1947 to 1978, Otto Maciag. Executed by Maciag, and another art master at the school, Michael Tovey,  the murals were dedicated at a service conducted by the Bishop of Monmouth, the Rt Rev Clifford Wright on 3 October 1987. He described them as "masterpieces of twentieth-century religious art”. In November 2008, a £2.3 million sports pavilion was completed and opened by the former British Lions player and Welsh captain, Eddie Butler, an old boy of the School.  It was designed by the architects Buttress Fuller Alsop Williams. In 2011 the school began the Heart Project.  This led to the sale of some outlying sites, such as St. James's House, and the re-organisation of others, to assist in the raising of funds for the redevelopment of the main school site.  Further funds came from the Haberdashers' Company, and the first phase was completed with the rebuilding of the Red Lion Block, renamed the William Jones Building.

The school today

With 650 pupils, the school offers boarding and day places as well as preparatory departments in a single-sex environment. A range of GCSE, A and AS level subjects are offered, with the Sixth Form having some collaborative teaching with pupils from the sister school, Haberdashers' Monmouth School for Girls (HMSG). Tatler magazine's 2020 Schools Guide noted its strong academic performance. The school charges fees for attendance; for 2019–2020, the annual fees are: day pupils, £16,275, boarding pupils, £30,852. The school operates a substantial bursary programme. In September 2018, Monmouth School was renamed Monmouth School for Boys after a merger of all five Haberdashers' Company schools in Monmouth. The Foundation now operates under the name Haberdashers' Monmouth Schools and consists of: Monmouth School for Boys (formerly Monmouth School), Monmouth School for Girls (formerly Haberdashers' Monmouth School for Girls or HMSG), Monmouth School Boys' Prep (formerly The Grange), Monmouth School Girls' Prep (formerly Inglefield House) and Monmouth Schools Pre-Prep and Nursery (formerly Agincourt School).

Houses
There are three age divisions in the school; lower (forms I and II) middle (forms III, IV, and V) and sixth form (forms VI.1 and VI.2). Within these divisions, the school operates a House system. As of December 2022, the houses are:
 Monnow House, the lower school boarding house;
 Wye and Dean Houses, the lower school day houses;
 Severn House, Town House, Monmouth House and Hereford House, middle school day houses;
 New House, Weirhead House, and School House, middle school boarding houses;
 Tudor, Glendower, and Buchanan Houses, which comprise the sixth form centre and VI.2 boarding.

Extracurricular activities
The school has its own theatre, The Blake, opened in 2004. Funded by Bob Blake, a former pupil, it is used as a venue for performances by both the school and the girls' school, and by external performers. The Glover Music School has an auditorium and teaching and practice rooms.  The strong musical tradition owes much to Michael Eveleigh, director of music at the school from 1950 to 1986, and his successors, there having been only five directors of music since the Second World War. Other extra-curricular activities include foreign expeditions, music and drama events as well as a newspaper, The Lion, a creative writing leaflet, The Lion's Tale, The Mon-Mouth, a bi-weekly, student-run newspaper and an annual magazine, The Monmothian, first published in 1882. The Combined Cadet Force, founded in 1904, which has both Army and RAF sections, is operated in collaboration with HMSG.

Sport

The school has a notable sporting tradition, with a high number of successful sportsmen amongst its alumni. The main sports are rugby, rowing and cricket. The school's rowing club, affiliated to British Rowing (boat code MNS), produced three championship crews at the 1988, 2007 and 2009 British Rowing Championships. Facilities include a boathouse, a sports complex which houses a six-lane swimming pool, indoor facilities including a weights and fitness suite, tennis courts, and a full size astroturf pitch. The Hitchcock sports pavilion, completed in 2008, stands on the playing fields, on the other side of the Wye from the school's main site. In addition to rugby, rowing and cricket, the school offers a range of other sports which include soccer, cross-country, tennis, basketball, golf, athletics, swimming, water polo, canoeing, and squash.

Other
The school has an alumni society, the Old Monmothian Club, founded in 1886. In June 2009, the school paid out £150,000 to settle a landmark pensions rights case brought by female catering and support staff who claimed that, as part-time workers, they had been unjustly excluded from the school's pension scheme.

Headmasters
 style="font-size:100%;"

 1615 John Owen
 1617 Humfrey Crewys
 1639 Nathaniel Taynton
 1657 Robert Brabourne 
 1658 Robert Frampton
 1663 John Harmer
 1663 Charles Hoole
 1664 William Morris
 1672 Thomas Bassett
 1687 Thomas Wright
 1691 Thomas Bassett (restored)
 1713 Andrew Cuthbert
 1723 James Birt
 1738 Baynham Barnes
 1758 John Crowe
 1780 Thomas Prosser
 1793 John Powell
 1823 William Jones /
 1828 John Oakley Hill

 1832 George Monnington
 1844 John Dundas Watherston
 1859 Charles Manley Roberts
 1891 Edward Hugh Culley 
 1906 Lionel James
 1928 Christopher Fairfax Scott
 1937 Wilfred Roy Lewin
 1941 Noel Chamberlain Elstob 
 1946 Cecil Howard Dunstan Cullingford
 1956 John Robert Murray Senior
 1959 R H S Hatton (acting)
 1959 Robert Finlay Glover
 1977 Nicholas Bomford
 1982 Rupert Lane
 1995 Peter Anthony
 1995 Timothy Haynes
 2005 Steven Connors
 2015 Andrew Daniel
 2020 Simon Dorman

Alumni 

 style="font-size:100%;"

Historical
 Angus Buchanan VC (1894–1944), soldier and holder of the Victoria Cross
 John Josiah Guest (1785–1852), industrialist
 Jacob Owen (1778-1880), architect
 James Endell Tyler (1789-1851), theologian 
 John Vassall (1924–1996), civil servant and spy
 David Thomas Gwynne-Vaughan (1871-1915), botanist and botanopalaeolontologist

Sporting
 Hallam Amos, (born 1994), rugby player
 Wayne Barnes, (born 1979), rugby union referee
 David Broome, CBE, (born 1940), showjumper
 Eddie Butler, (1957-2022), rugby player / TV commentator
 Jonathan Denning, (born 1991), first-class cricketer
 John Gwilliam (1923-2016), rugby player
 Steve James, (born 1967), cricketer
 Keith Jarrett, (born 1948), rugby player
 Martin Johnson (1949-2021), sports journalist
 Tom Lucy, (born 1988), rower
 William Marsh (1917–1978), cricketer
Lewis Oliva, (born 1992), team GB cyclist 
 Richard Parks, (born 1977), rugby player
 Kyle Tudge, (born 1987), cricketer
 Huw Waters, (born 1986), cricketer
 Charles Wiggin, (born 1950), rower 
 Robin Williams, MBE, (born 1959) rower and coach 

Public Life
 Sir John Beddington, CMG, (born 1945), scientist and UK Government Chief Scientific Adviser
 Richard Carwardine, (born 1947), historian and President of Corpus Christi College, Oxford
 David Warren Arthur East, CBE, (born 1961) CEO Rolls-Royce Holdings 
 Derek Ezra, Baron Ezra MBE (1919–2015), Chairman of the National Coal Board
 Christopher Herbert, (born 1944), ecclesiastic and Bishop of St Albans
 Paul Langford (1945–2015), historian and Rector of Lincoln College, Oxford
 David Lewis, 1st Baron Brecon (1905-1976), businessman and politician
 Colin Moynihan, 4th Baron Moynihan, (born 1955), politician and sportsman
 Frank Owen(1905-1979), politician and journalist
 Peter Young, DSO, MC (1915–1988), soldier, historian and founder of The Sealed Knot.

Arts and Entertainment
 Leonard Clark (1905-1981), poet
 Angus McBean (1904–1990), photographer
 Richard Marner (1921–2004), actor
 Grant Nicholas, (born 1967), guitarist and singer with the rock band Feeder
 Richard Pearson (1918–2011), actor
 Tom Price, (born 1980), actor and comedian
 Victor Spinetti (1933–2012), actor
 Glyn Worsnip (1938–1996), actor and broadcaster

Footnotes

References

Sources

External links

 Official website
 The Blake Theatre
 Monmouth Schools Sports Club official website
 School YouTube Channel
 Old Monmothians Club

Haberdashers' Schools
Educational institutions established in the 1610s
Private schools in Monmouthshire
Boys' schools in Wales
Christian schools in Wales
1614 establishments in Wales
Boarding schools in Wales
Member schools of the Headmasters' and Headmistresses' Conference
Buildings and structures in Monmouth, Wales
Grade II listed buildings in Monmouthshire
Diamond schools